St. John's Church is a Lutheran church in Riga, the capital of Latvia. It is a parish church of the Evangelical Lutheran Church of Latvia. The church is situated at the address 24 Skārņu Street.

Dedication
The church is dedicated to St John the Baptist and contains several art works related to the saint, including a large painting on the north side of the crossing, and a stained glass window depicting the saint, to the right (south) of the high altar. The window, with others, was installed around 1900.

History
The church is built on the site of the bishop's palace of  Albert of Riga (thirteenth century). In 1234 Dominican friars took responsibility for the original small chapel and dedicated it to John the Baptist. It was extended around 1330, and continued as a Dominican chapel and parish church until 1523, and the Reformation. It continued as a parish church of the reformed Evangelical Lutheran Church. From 1587 there was further expansion of the church, in stages. The church suffered severe damage in Riga's great city fire of 31 May 1677, but was repaired, with a new spire added.

Current use
The church is an active place of worship, with more than a thousand registered members, and public worship every Sunday morning and Wednesday evening. It is also a popular tourist venue, and is regularly open to visitors when guides are available. The church is also used as a concert venue, due to its large size and good acoustic properties.

References

External links

 Official website (in Latvian).

Churches in Riga